Lebensborn e.V. (literally: "Fount of Life") was an SS-initiated, state-supported, registered association in Nazi Germany with the stated goal of increasing the number of children born who met the Nazi standards of "racially pure" and "healthy" Aryans, based on Nazi eugenics (also called "racial hygiene" by some eugenicists). Lebensborn was established by Heinrich Himmler, and provided welfare to its mostly unmarried mothers, encouraged anonymous births by unmarried women at their maternity homes, and mediated adoption of children by likewise "racially pure" and "healthy" parents, particularly SS members and their families. The Cross of Honour of the German Mother was given to the women who bore the most Aryan children. Abortion was legalised (and, more commonly, endorsed) by the Nazis for disabled and non-Germanic children, but strictly punished otherwise.

Initially set up in Germany in 1935, Lebensborn expanded into several occupied European countries with Germanic populations during the Second World War. It included the selection of "racially worthy" orphans for adoption and care for children born from Aryan women who had been in relationships with SS members. It originally excluded children born from unions between common soldiers and foreign women, because there was no proof of 'racial purity' on both sides. During the war, many children were kidnapped from their parents and judged by Aryan criteria for their suitability to be raised in Lebensborn homes, and fostered by German families.

At the Nuremberg Trials, much direct evidence was found of the kidnapping of children by Nazi Germany, across Ukraine and Poland during the period 1939–1945.

Background
The Lebensborn e.V. (e.V. stands for eingetragener Verein or registered association), meaning "fount of life", was founded on 12 December 1935, to counteract falling birth rates in Germany, and to promote Nazi eugenics. Located in Munich, the organization was partly an office within the Schutzstaffel (SS) responsible for certain family welfare programs, and partly a society for Nazi leaders.

On 13 September 1936, Heinrich Himmler wrote the following to members of the SS:

In 1939, membership stood at 8,000, of which 3,500 were SS leaders.
The Lebensborn office was part of SS Rasse und Siedlungshauptamt (SS Race and Settlement Main Office) until 1938, when it was transferred to Hauptamt Persönlicher Stab Reichsführer-SS (Personal Staff of the Reichführer-SS), i.e. directly overseen by Himmler. Leaders of Lebensborn e. V. were SS-Standartenführer  and SS-Oberführer Dr. Gregor Ebner.

Implementation

Initially the programme served as a welfare institution for wives of SS officers; the organization ran facilitiesprimarily maternity homeswhere women could give birth or get help with family matters. The programme also accepted unmarried women who were either pregnant or had already given birth and were in need of aid, provided that both the woman and the father of the child were classified as "racially valuable". About 60% of the mothers were unmarried. The program allowed them to give birth secretly away from home without social stigma. In case the mothers wanted to give up the children, the program also had orphanages and an adoption service. When dealing with non-SS members, parents and children were usually examined by SS doctors before admission.

The first Lebensborn home (known as "Heim Hochland") opened in 1936, in Steinhöring, a tiny village not far from Munich. The first home outside of Germany opened in Norway in 1941. Many of these facilities were established in confiscated houses and former nursing homes owned by Jews. Leaders of the League of German Girls were instructed to recruit young women with the potential to become good breeding partners for SS officers.

While Lebensborn e. V. established facilities in several occupied countries, its activities were concentrated around Germany, Norway and occupied northeastern Europe, mainly Poland. The main focus in occupied Norway was aiding children born to Norwegian women and fathered by German soldiers. In northeastern Europe the organisation, in addition to services provided to SS members, engaged in the transfer of children, mostly orphans, to families in Germany.

Lebensborn e. V. had or planned to have facilities in the following countries (some were merely field offices):
 Germany: 10
 Austria: 3
 Poland (General Governmentthe occupied Polish territory and annexed lands of Poland): 6 (8 if Stettin and Bad Polzin are included.)
 Norway: 9
 Denmark: 2
 France: 1 (February 1944August 1944)in Lamorlaye
 Belgium: 1 (March 1943September 1944)in Wégimont, in the municipality of Soumagne
 Netherlands: 1
 Luxembourg: 1

About 8,000 children were born in Lebensborn homes in Germany, and between 8,000 and 12,000 children in Norway. Elsewhere the total number of births was much lower. For more information about Lebensborn in Norway, see war children.

In Norway the Lebensborn organisation handled approximately 250 adoptions. In most of these cases the mothers had agreed to the adoption, but not all were informed that their children would be sent to Germany for adoption. The Norwegian government recovered only 170 of these children after the war.

Germanisation

In 1939, the Nazis started to kidnap children from foreign countriesmainly from Yugoslavia and Poland, but also including Russia, Ukraine, Czechoslovakia, Romania, Estonia, Latvia, and Norway for the Lebensborn program. They started to do this because "It is our duty to take [the children] with us to remove them from their environment ... either we win over any good blood that we can use for ourselves and give it a place in our people or we destroy this blood," Himmler reportedly said.

The Nazis would seize children in full view of the parents. The kidnapped children were administered several tests and were categorised into three groups:
 those considered desirable to be included into the German population,
 those who were acceptable, and
 the unwanted.

The children classified as unwanted were taken to concentration camps to work or were killed. The children from the other groups, if between the ages of 2 and 6, were placed with families in the programme to be brought up by them in a kind of foster child status. Children of ages 6 to 12 were placed in German boarding schools. The schools assigned the children new German names and taught them to be proud to be part of Germany. They forced the children to forget their birth parents and erased any records of their ancestry. Those who resisted Germanisation were beaten and, if a child continued to rebel, he or she would be sent to a concentration camp.

In the final stages of the war, the files of all children kidnapped for the programme were destroyed. As a result, researchers have found it nearly impossible to learn how many children were taken. The Polish government has claimed that 10,000 children were kidnapped, and less than 15% were returned to their biological parents. Other estimates include numbers as high as 200,000, although according to Dirk Moses a more likely number is around 20,000.

Post-war

Kidnapping charges

After the war, the branch of the Lebensborn organisation operating in north-eastern Europe was accused of kidnapping children deemed "racially valuable" in order to resettle them with German families. However, of approximately 10,000 foreign-born children located after the war in the American-controlled area of Germany, in the trial of the leaders of the Lebensborn organisation (United States of America v. Ulrich Greifelt, et al.), the court found that 340 had been handled by Lebensborn e. V. The accused were acquitted on charges of kidnapping.

The court found ample evidence of an existing programme of the kidnapping or forced movement of children in north-eastern Europe, but concluded that these activities were carried out by individuals who were not members of Lebensborn. Exactly how many children were moved by Lebensborn or other organisations remains unknown due to the destruction of archives by SS members prior to fleeing the advancing Allied forces.

From the trial's transcript:

The prosecution has failed to prove with the requisite certainty the participation of Lebensborn, and the defendants connected there with in the kidnapping programme conducted by the Nazis. While the evidence has disclosed that thousands upon thousands of children were unquestionably kidnapped by other agencies or organisations and brought into Germany, the evidence has further disclosed that only a small percentage of the total number ever found their way into Lebensborn. And of this number only in isolated instances did Lebensborn take children who had a living parent. The majority of those children in any way connected with Lebensborn were orphans of ethnic Germans.

Upon the evidence submitted, the defendant Sollmann is found not guilty on counts one and two of the indictment.

Treatment of children
After Germany's surrender, the press reported on the unusually good weight and health of the "super babies". They spent time outdoors in sunlight and received two baths a day. Everything that came into contact with the babies was disinfected first. Nurses ensured that the children ate everything given to them. Until the last days of the war, the mothers and the children at maternity homes got the best treatment available, including food, although others in the area were starving. Once the war ended, local communities often took revenge on the women, beating them, cutting off their hair, and running them out of the community. Many Lebensborn children were born to unwed mothers. After the war, Lebensborn survivors were often subjected to ostracization.

False assumptions
Himmler's effort to secure a "racially pure" Greater Germany, sloppy journalism on the subject, as well as Nazi ideology retained by some, led to persistent false assumptions about the programme.  The main misconception was that the programme involved coercive breeding. The first stories reporting that Lebensborn was a coercive breeding programme can be found in the German magazine Revue, which ran a series on the subject in the 1950s.

The programme did intend to promote the growth of Aryan populations, through encouraging relationships between German soldiers and Nordic women in occupied countries.  Access to Lebensborn was restricted in accordance with the Nordicist eugenic and racial policies of Nazism, which could be referred to as supervised selective breeding.  Recently discovered records and ongoing testimony of Lebensborn childrenand some of their parentsshows that some SS men did sire children in Himmler's Lebensborn program. This was widely rumored within Germany during the period of the programme.

Self-help groups and aftermath
Help, recognition, and justice for Lebensborn survivors have been varied.

In Norway, children born to Norwegian mothers by German fathers were allegedly often bullied, raped, abused, and persecuted by the government after the war, and placed in mental institutions. The Norwegian government attempted to deport Lebensborn children to Germany, Brazil, and Australia but did not succeed. A group of Lebensborn children sought compensation from the Norwegian government, who they saw as being complicit in their mistreatment. In 2008, their case before the European Court of Human Rights was dismissed as the events had happened too long ago, but they were each offered an £8,000 payment from the Norwegian government.

In November 2006, in the German town of Wernigerode, an open meeting took place among several Lebensborn children, with the intention of dispelling myths and encouraging those affected to investigate their origins.

General documents on Lebensborn activities are administered by International Tracing Service and by German Federal Archives. The association Verein kriegskind.de is among those that published search efforts (Suchbitten) to identify Lebensborn children.

In popular culture
The British movie The Divided Heart (1954) was inspired by the true story of a Slovenian child whose father was executed by Nazis and whose mother was deported to the Auschwitz concentration camp. The boy was sent to Germany and adopted by a German couple. Years later he is returned to his biological mother.

German author Will Berthold's novel Lebensborn e. V. Tatsachenroman (1958) tells a rather fictionalized narrative of the organization.

The Czech TV film Spring of Life (2000) tells the story of a Sudeten German teenager recruited as a future mother into a Lebensborn in Poland.

The 1986 U.S. television film, Of Pure Blood is about these breeding facilities during the Third Reich and the discovery of them by Lee Remick's "Alicia Browning" character as herself being one of these children.

In the television series, The Man in the High Castle, Joe Blake and Nicole Dörmer are among several characters who were Lebensborn children.

The video game My Child Lebensborn, which won the BAFTA Games Awards in 2018 for "Game Beyond Entertainment", lets players experience the bullying Lebensborn children went through after the war.

The Canadian TV show X Company depicts a French Lebensborn home in its first season.

In the novel and film Sophie's Choice, Sophie unsuccessfully attempts to place her son in the Lebensborn program.

The movie Jojo Rabbit satirizes eugenics efforts by depicting a group of lookalike blonde children in Deutsches Jungvolk organization and referring to them as clones.

The manga Elfen Lied includes a program to exterminate the human race and replace it with a superhuman species known as the Diclonii. This program is called the Lebensborn.

See also

 Nazi eugenics
 European sexuality leading up to and during World War II
 Forced disappearance in Argentina, children of the Desaparecidos in Argentina were taken by the military junta in the Dirty War and placed with junta supporters for adoption and raising
 Lidice
 RuSHA Trial
 War children
 Baby boomers

References
Notes

Further reading

England/US
 Clay, Catrine; Leapman, Michael. (1995). Master race: the Lebensborn experiment in Nazi Germany. Publisher: Hodder & Stoughton, . (German version: Herrenmenschen – Das Lebensborn-Experiment der Nazis. Publisher: Heyne-TB, 1997)
 "Children of World War II: the Hidden Enemy Legacy." Ed. Kjersti Ericsson and Eva Simonsen. New York: Berg Publishers, 2005. 
 Marc Hillel and Clarissa Henry. Of Pure Blood. 1976.  (French version: Au nom de la race. Publisher: Fayard)
 von Oelhafen, Ingrid; Tate, Tim. (2016) Hitler's Forgotten Children: A True Story of the Lebensborn Program and One Woman's Search for Her Real Identity.  New York: Penguin Random House.  
 Trials of War Criminals – Before the Nuernberg Military Tribunals Under Control Council Law No. 10. Vol. 5: United States v. Ulrich Greifelt, et al. (Case 8: 'RuSHA Case'). Publisher: US Government Printing Office, District of Columbia, 1950.
 Thompson, Larry V. Lebensborn and the Eugenics Policy of the Reichsführer-SS. Central European History 4 (1971): 54–77.
 Wältermann, Dieter. The Functions and Activities of the Lebensborn Organization Within the SS, the Nazi Regime, and Nazi Ideology. The Honors Journal II (1985: 5–23).

France
 Marc Hillel, Au nom de la race, Éditions Fayard, 1975. .
 Nancy Huston, Lignes de faille, Éd. Actes Sud, 2006. .
 Nancy Huston, Fault Lines, Atlantic Books, 2007.
 Katherine Maroger, Les racines du silence, Éditions Anne Carrière, 2008. .
 Boris Thiolay: Lebensborn. La fabrique des enfants parfaits. Enqête sur ces Francais nés dans les maternités SS. (Titel aus dem Französischen übersetzt: Lebensborn. Die Fabrik der perfekten Kinder). Éditions Flammarion, Paris, 2012.

Germany
 Dorothee Schmitz-Köster: Deutsche Mutter bist du bereit – Alltag im Lebensborn. Publisher: Aufbau-Verlag, 2002.
 Gisela Heidenreich: Das endlose Jahr. Die langsame Entdeckung der eigenen Biographie – ein Lebensbornschicksal. Published: 2002.
 Georg Lilienthal: Der Lebensborn e. V. – Ein Instrument nationalsozialistischer Rassenpolitik. Publisher: Fischer, 1993 (possibly republished in 2003).
 Kare Olsen: Vater: Deutscher. – Das Schicksal der Norwegischen Lebensbornkinder und ihrer Mütter von 1940 bis heute. 2002. (the authoritative resource on Lebensborn in Norway and available in Norwegian: Krigens barn: De norske krigsbarna og deres mødre. Published: Aschehoug 1998. ).
 Jörg Albrecht: Rohstoff für Übermenschen. Published: Artikel in Zeit-Punkte 3/2001 zum Thema Biomedizin, pp. 16–18.
 Benz, W.; Graml, H.; Weiß, H.(1997): Enzyklopädie des Nationalsozialismus. Published: Digitale Bibliothek, CD-ROM, Band 25, Directmedia GmbH, Berlin.

Norway
 Kåre Olsen: "Vater: Deutscher." Das Schicksal der norwegischen Lebensbornkinder und ihrer Mütter von 1940 bis heute. Campus, Frankfurt 2002,

External links

 Nazi Program to Breed Master Race, Lebensborn Children Break SilenceSpiegel Online International
 "The Lebensborn Organization" Southern Illinois University
 Trial of Ulrich Greifelt and others Law Reports of the Trials of War Criminals, United Nations War Crimes Commission, London 1949 (copy at University of the West of England website)
 "The Lebensborn" Jewish Virtual Library's description of the Lebensborn programme
 "Himmler was my godfather" An online press article
 The Last Nazis: Children of the Master Race BBC documentary about the Lebensborn project
 Third Reich Poster Child Portrait of a Lebensborn child in EXBERLINER magazine
 National Archival Services of Norway

Children in war
Heinrich Himmler
Natalism
Nazi eugenics
Nazi Party organizations
Women in Nazi Germany